The 2009 CollegeInsider.com Postseason Tournament (CIT) was a single-elimination tournament of 16 National Collegiate Athletic Association (NCAA) Division I teams that was won by Old Dominion. Old Dominion defeated  66–62 in the tournament final.

The 16 selected teams were from a pool that were not invited to the 2009 NCAA Men's Division I Basketball Tournament or the 2009 National Invitation Tournament.

The tournament began with first round games on March 17, 2009 and concluded with the championship game on March 31.

Bracket
Bracket is for visual purposes only. The CIT does not have a set bracket.

Home teams listed second.

References

CollegeInsider.com Tournament
CollegeInsider.com Postseason Tournament